The Water Ski World Championships is a bi-annual water ski competition that has taken place since 1949. Held near the end of the competition season, the World Championships are one of the sport's oldest major championships along with the Masters Water Ski Tournament (since 1959) and the U.S. National Water Ski Championships (since 1939).

Types of Water Ski World Championships
 Slalom, Trick, Jump Skiing from 1949
 Slalom, Trick, Jump Skiing (Junior) from 1986
 Slalom, Trick, Jump Skiing (U21) from 2003
 Slalom, Trick, Jump Skiing (+35) from 2010
 Barefoot Skiing from 1978
 Barefoot Skiing (Junior) from 1995
 Cable Skiing from 1988
 Cable Wakeboarding from 2001
 Adaptive Skiing (Disabled) from 1993
 Ski Racing from 1979

Continental Championships
 Asia-Pacific Water Ski Championships from 1986
 European Water Ski Championships from 1947
 European Under-21 Water Ski Championships from 1990
 European Under-17 Water Ski Championships from 1975
 European Under-14 Water Ski Championships from 1975

Tournament champions

See also
 Water skiing
 List of Water Skiing European Champions
 List of Water Skiing Under-21 European Champions
 List of Water Skiing Under-17 European Champions
 Masters Tournament (water ski)
 World water skiing champions

References

 
Recurring sporting events established in 1949
World Championships
Water Ski